Alexys Brunel (born 10 October 1998) is a French cyclist, who currently rides for French amateur team Dunkerque Grand Littoral. Brunel retired on 22 June 2022 from professional cycling to focus on other aspects of life. However, he has since returned to racing as an amateur, notably winning a stage of the 2022 Tour de Guadeloupe.

Major results

2015
 National Junior Road Championships
2nd Road race
2nd Time trial
 2nd La Philippe Gilbert Juniors
 10th Time trial, UCI Junior Road World Championships
2016
 1st  Time trial, UEC European Junior Road Championships
 1st Chrono des Nations Juniors
 1st Gent–Wevelgem Juniors
 1st  Mountains classification Course de la Paix Juniors
 2nd Time trial, National Junior Road Championships
 2nd La Philippe Gilbert Juniors
2017
 1st  Time trial, National Under-23 Road Championships
 6th Paris–Roubaix Espoirs
 9th Time trial, UEC European Under-23 Road Championships
2018
 National Under-23 Road Championships
1st  Time trial
2nd Road race
 1st  Time trial, National Amateur Road Championships
 2nd Chrono des Nations U23
 3rd Liège–Bastogne–Liège U23
 8th Time trial, UEC European Under-23 Road Championships
2019
 1st Paris–Tours Espoirs
 5th Overall Tour de Bretagne
2020
 3rd Overall Étoile de Bessèges
1st  Young rider classification
1st Stage 1
2021
 3rd Time trial, National Road Championships
 8th Polynormande
2022
 1st Stage 8 Tour de Guadeloupe

Notes

References

External links

1998 births
Living people
French male cyclists
People from Boulogne-sur-Mer
Sportspeople from Pas-de-Calais
Cyclists from Hauts-de-France
21st-century French people